Adam A. Schider (April 21, 1886 – ?) was an American politician.

Born in the Town of Almond, Portage County, Wisconsin, Schider went to business school. He was a farmer and auctioneer. Schider lived in Manawa, Wisconsin. He served on the Waupaca County, Wisconsin Board of Supervisors and served on the school board. Schider also was the town assessor. In 1927, Schider served in the Wisconsin State Assembly and was a Republican.

Notes

1886 births
Year of death unknown
People from Portage County, Wisconsin
People from Waupaca County, Wisconsin
Businesspeople from Wisconsin
Farmers from Wisconsin
County supervisors in Wisconsin
School board members in Wisconsin
Republican Party members of the Wisconsin State Assembly